Noël-Philippe-Claude de Montboissier de Beaufort, marquis de Canillac (16 February 1695 – 31 September 1765), was an 18th-century French soldier, diplomat and peer of France.

The son of Jean-Gaspard de Montboissier, baron de Dienne (who died 1714) by his wife Marie-Claire (died 1730), daughter of Jean d'Estaing, marquis de Saillant, he was commissioned as a cavalry officer in the French Army.

He was promoted Brigadier-General in 1719, Maréchal de camp in 1734 and Lieutenant-General in 1738. The Marquis also served as Ambassador to Rome, before being posted to London.

The marquis married, in 1711, Marie-Anne-Geneviève de Maillé de La Tour-Landry (died 1742), daughter of Louis-Joseph de Maillé-Brézé, baron de Coulonces, by his wife Louise Mallier du Houssay. They had two sons and two daughters.

See also 
 Château de Montboissier
 Duc de Beaufort
 Honoré de Balzac
 List of Ambassadors of France to the United Kingdom

Notes

1695 births
1765 deaths
People associated with the University of Cambridge
French soldiers
French generals
Jacobites
Order of Saint Louis recipients
Knights of Malta
French marquesses